Menaruyeh (also Romanized as Menārūyeh) is a village in Ahmadabad Rural District, in the Central District of Firuzabad County, Fars Province, Iran. At the 2006 census, its population was 177, in 40 families.

References 

Populated places in Firuzabad County